Robert or Bob Stanton may refer to:
 Robert Stanton (merchant), member of the British parliament for Penryn, 1824–1826
 Robert L. Stanton (1810–1885), American Presbyterian minister, teacher and president of Miami University, 1868–1871
 Robert Brewster Stanton (1846–1922), United States civil and mining engineer
 Robert Stanton (architect) (1900–1983), American architect
 Robert Stanton (Indiana politician) (1902–?), American dentist and Indiana state legislator
 Kirby Grant (1911–1985), American film actor who appeared under the name "Robert Stanton" in the early 1940s
 Bob Haymes (1923–1989), American songwriter, actor and television personality who appeared under the names "Bob Stanton" and "Robert Stanton" in the mid-to-late 1940s
 Robert Stanton (park director) (born 1940), director of the United States National Park Service, 1997–2001
 Bob Stanton (golfer) (born 1946), Australian golfer
 Robert Stanton (actor) (born 1963), American film and television actor
 Robert Stanton (soccer) (born 1972), Australian soccer player of the 1990s–2000s and current coach

See also
 Bob Staton (born ), American academic administrator